Bernard A. Coyne (July 27, 1897May 20, 1921) is one of only 20 individuals in medical history to have stood  or more.

Coyne was the tallest ever eunuchoidal infantile giant, a condition also known as gigantism. He was the tallest person in the world at the time of his death when, like Robert Wadlow, he was still growing. He reportedly wore size 24 (American) shoes.

Bernard Coyne died in 1921. He is buried in Anthon, Iowa, in a specially-made, extra-large coffin.

References

1897 births
1921 deaths
Burials in Iowa
Castrated people
Deaths from liver disease
People from Woodbury County, Iowa
People with gigantism